A Message from Mars is a play by Richard Ganthony, first performed at London's Avenue Theatre in November 1899.

Summary
The play presents an unusual evening in the life of Horace Parker, a selfish man. Horace refuses to escort Minnie, his ward and fiancee, to a ball because he would prefer to spend his evening at home reading about new discoveries about the planet Mars. Minnie goes to the ball with another escort, leaving Horace home alone. Horace falls asleep and dreams that he is visited by a man, a Messenger from Mars. The Messenger sets out to cure Horace of his selfishness. After a series of visions, the Messenger reduces Horace to a beggar in rags. Having realized the error of his ways, Horace awakens a changed man.

Authorship and controversy

Ganthony said that the emphasis on play building came from his acting experiences (in plays like The Cat and the Cherub) and helped shape the elements that were used in A Message from Mars. Ganthony used A Message from Mars to convey the negative consequences of selfishness via exploiting an extremely selfish man while also using astronomy as a tool in conveying these consequences.

Gathony may have drafted the initial script for A Message from Mars as early as 1890 or 1891. After being assisted by Henry Miller, Ganthony was unable to get the play produced on the American stage.  To combat this, Ganthony sold his manuscript outright, for £400, to British comedic actor Charles Hawtrey. Working with his brother George, Hawtrey rewrote the script.

In 1903 Gathony publicly challenged allegations published in The Daily Express that the play's success was entirely due to the revisions Charles and George Hawtrey had made to Ganthony's original script. In court Ganthony testified that he saw no substantial difference between the play he wrote and the version he saw on stage. Hawtrey, however, claimed that nine-tenths of the dialogue was his own, as were the characters of the policeman and the boy. Ultimately the court found in favor of Ganthony, awarding him £200 in damages.;

Performance history

A Message from Mars premiered at London's Avenue Theatre in November 1899. Two years later, following a very successful run of more than 500 performances in London, the play and its star performer, Charles Hawtrey, transferred to New York's Garrick Theatre. Between 1903 and 1905, Hawtrey's theater company took the play on tour throughout the United States.

Adaptations
A Message from Mars was filmed in 1903, 1913, and 1921. Charles Hawtrey, who starred in the original stage production, played the role of the Messenger in the 1913 film.

A novelization of the play was written by "Lester Lurgan" (Mabel Winifred Knowles) in 1912. The following year a second edition was published, illustrated with stills from the 1913 film.

Legacy

Ganthony said that A Message from Mars was the best of the comedic plays that he wrote.

References

External links

1899 plays
Comedy plays
Science fiction theatre
West End plays
Dreams in theatre